The Royal Armoured Corps is the component of the British Army, that together with the Household Cavalry provides its armour capability, with vehicles such as the Challenger 2 Tank and the Scimitar Reconnaissance Vehicle. It includes most of the Army's armoured regiments, both the Royal Tank Regiment and those converted from old horse cavalry regiments. Today it comprises twelve regiments, eight regular and four reserve. Although the Household Cavalry Regiment (the Life Guards and the Blues and Royals) provide an armoured regiment, they are not part of the RAC.

History

The RAC was created on 4 April 1939, just before World War II started, by combining regiments from the cavalry of the line which had mechanised with the Royal Tank Corps (renamed Royal Tank Regiment). As the war went on and other regular cavalry and Territorial Army Yeomanry units became mechanised, the corps was enlarged. A significant number of infantry battalions also converted to the armoured role as RAC regiments. In addition, the RAC created its own training and support regiments. Finally, in 1944, the RAC absorbed the regiments of the Reconnaissance Corps.

Present day

Regiments 
The Royal Armoured Corps is divided into regiments which operate main battle tanks (Armour), those in reconnaissance vehicles (Armoured Cavalry), and those in Weapons Mount vehicles (Light Cavalry). Of these, three regiments are designated Dragoon Guards, two as Hussars, one as Lancers and one as Dragoons. The remaining regiment is the Royal Tank Regiment. In the regular army, there are three armoured regiments, three armoured cavalry regiments and three light cavalry regiments. In the army reserve, there is one armoured regiment and three light cavalry regiments.

Being a corps, the RAC is made up of several independent regiments, but the corps does control a few separate units which include:

 Training and Staff
 AFV Training Group
 Regimental Headquarters, Royal Armoured Corps
 The Armour Centre, Bovington Camp
 Royal Armoured Corps Training Regiment, at Allenby Barracks, Bovington Camp
 Regular Army
 1st The Queen's Dragoon Guards (QDG) - Light Cavalry – 7th Infantry Brigade & Headquarters East
 The Royal Scots Dragoon Guards (Carabiniers and Greys) (SCOTS DG) - Light Cavalry – 51st Infantry Brigade & Headquarters Scotland
 The Royal Dragoon Guards (RDG) - Armoured Cavalry – 20th Armoured Brigade
 The Queen's Royal Hussars (The Queen's Own and Royal Irish) (QRH) – Armour – 20th Armoured Brigade Combat Team
 The Royal Lancers (Queen Elizabeths' Own) (RL) - Armoured Cavalry – 1st Armoured Infantry Brigade
 The King's Royal Hussars (KRH) – Armour – 12th Armoured Infantry Brigade
 The Light Dragoons (LD) - Light Cavalry – 4th Infantry Brigade & Headquarters North East
 Royal Tank Regiment2 (RTR) – Armour – 12th Armoured Brigade Combat Team

A Royal Tank Regiment CBRN reconnaissance and survey squadron forms part of 28 Engineer Regiment (C-CBRN), Royal Engineers

Army Reserve - Yeomanry
The Royal Yeomanry (RY) - Light Cavalry – 7th Infantry Brigade & Headquarters East
The Queen's Own Yeomanry (QOY) - Light Cavalry – 4th Infantry Brigade & Headquarters North East
Scottish and North Irish Yeomanry (SNIY) - Light Cavalry – 51st Infantry Brigade & Headquarters Scotland
The Royal Wessex Yeomanry (RWxY) - Armour – 3rd (United Kingdom) Division

A system of pairing exists in the British Army of Regular to Reserve unit. Through this, operational and training cycles are aligned, resources shared and strategic depth enabled. In the Royal Armoured Corps this manifests with each yeomanry unit being paired with a regular unit of the same role.

1: The Royal Wessex Yeomanry provides replacement soldiers for armoured regiments, and therefore is paired with all three regular army units operating main battle tanks.

Basing

Tidworth - Kings Royal Hussars; Royal Tank Regiment, The Queen's Royal Hussars (The Queen's Own and Royal Irish)
Catterick - The Royal Dragoon Guards; The Royal Lancers; The Light Dragoons
Swanton Morley - 1st The Queen's Dragoon Guards
Leuchars - The Royal Scots Dragoon Guards (Carabiniers and Greys)
London & Midlands - Royal Yeomanry
South of England - Royal Wessex Yeomanry
North of England - Queen's Own Yeomanry
Scotland & Northern Ireland - Scottish and North Irish Yeomanry

Band
The Band of the Royal Armoured Corps is the single band representing the RAC, which falls under the administration of the Royal Corps of Army Music. This was formed in 2014 by the amalgamation of the Heavy Cavalry and Cambrai Band, and the Light Cavalry Band. The Band of the Royal Armoured Corps is stationed at Catterick.  However, as part of the 2019 reorganisation of the CAMUS, the band was merged into British Army Band Catterick.

Reorganisations

Delivering Security in a Changing World (2004)
The reorganisation of the Army announced in 2004 led to significant changes to the Royal Armoured Corps. Reorganisation that began in 2003 would see three armoured regiments removed from Germany to the UK, with one re-roled as an FR regiment. In addition, three Challenger 2 squadrons will be converted to Interim Medium Armour Squadrons, while each FR regiment will gain a Command and Support Squadron.

Deployments
As part of the reorganisation, postings will be realigned:

UK based regiments
Catterick: Armoured Regiment (RDG) (1 Armoured Infantry Brigade), Formation Reconnaissance Regiment (QRL) (1 Armoured Infantry Brigade)
Tidworth: 2 x Armoured Regiment (2RTR, KRH), (1st Mechanized Brigade, 12th Mechanized Brigade,)
Swanton Morley: Formation Reconnaissance Regiment (LD) (Theatre Troops)
Warminster: Training/Demonstration squadron (A Squadron, RTR)
Honington: Armoured Regiment (1RTR)
Bovington: HQ RAC

Germany based regiments

Sennelager: Armoured Regiment (QRH), Formation Reconnaissance Regiment (QDG) (20 Armoured Brigade)

Strategic Defence and Security Review (2010)/Army 2020
In 2012, following the Strategic Defence and Security Review of 2010, specific proposals about the make up of the future British Army were announced under the title Army 2020. These proposals were intended to reduce the size of the army to around 82,000. The Royal Armoured Corps was to be reduced by a total of two regiments, with the 9th/12th Royal Lancers amalgamated with the Queen's Royal Lancers to form a single lancer regiment, the Royal Lancers, and the 1st and 2nd Royal Tank Regiments joined to form a single Royal Tank Regiment.

The Royal Armoured Corps will also see a shift with one third of its regiments operating as armoured regiments with main battle tanks, another third as formation reconnaissance regiments and a final third as light cavalry using Jackal vehicles. Armoured regiments would consist of Type 56 regiments, each with three Sabre Squadrons (comprising 18 Challenger 2 Tanks each) and a command and recce squadron. Armoured Cavalry or formation reconnaissance regiments would also have a command and recce squadron and three Sabre Squadrons; which will initially be equipped with Combat Vehicle Reconnaissance (Tracked), and then with Future Rapid Effect System Scout vehicles. Jackal regiments will be part of the Adaptable Force, comprising three Sabre Squadrons (each with 16 vehicles). These regiments will be paired with a Yeomanry regiment.

The new structure of the Reaction Force will see three armoured regiments, each assigned to a new "Armoured Infantry Brigade", alongside a formation reconnaissance regiment (renamed as "armoured cavalry"), two armoured infantry battalions and a heavy protected mobility battalion. These six regiments will fall operationally under what will become known as the "reaction forces", which will be the army's high readiness force. The remaining three regiments will be located with the remainder of the regular army under what has been term the "adaptable forces", which will provide a pool of resources to back up operations conducted by the "reaction forces".

This new basing plan on 5 March 2013 gave an overview of where the regiments will be based. All RAC regiments will be UK based, with the 1st The Queen's Dragoon Guards moving to Swanton Morley, The Royal Scots Dragoon Guards moving to the Leuchars area, the Queen's Royal Hussars to Tidworth, the Royal Lancers settling in Catterick, the Light Dragoons in Catterick, and the Royal Tank Regiment to Tidworth. The expected Army 2020 layout for the RAC is to be:

Future Soldier (2021)
In November 2021, the UK Government published Future Soldier, the planned reform of the British Army following its integrated defence and security review. Part of this would see a reorganisation of the regiments of the Royal Armoured Corps.

1st (United Kingdom) Division
1st (UK) Division is planned as the UK's primary land element for operations outside the European theatre, as well as operations supporting NATO's flanks. It consists of four infantry-centered brigades - two of these will contain regular light cavalry regiments, while a third serves as a parent formation for units of the Army Reserve.
4th Light Brigade Combat Team
The Light Dragoons (Light Cavalry)
7th Light Mechanised Brigade Combat Team
The Royal Scots Dragoon Guards (Carabiniers and Greys) (Light Cavalry)
19th Brigade
The Scottish and North Irish Yeomanry (Army Reserve)
The Queen's Own Yeomanry (Army Reserve)

3rd (United Kingdom) Division
3rd (UK) Division is planned as the UK's main reaction force, intended to act as a lead formation alongside NATO, and primarily consists of a pair of armoured brigades containing the army's armoured and armoured cavalry units, and a third brigade containing the remainder of the army's armoured cavalry units tasked primarily with reconnaissance.
12th Armoured Brigade Combat Team
The Royal Tank Regiment (Armoured)
The King's Royal Hussars (Armoured Cavalry)
The Royal Wessex Yeomanry (Army Reserve)
20th Armoured Brigade Combat Team
The Queen's Royal Hussars (Queen's Own and Royal Irish) (Armoured)
The Royal Dragoon Guards (Armoured Cavalry)
1st Deep Recce Strike Brigade Combat Team
Household Cavalry Regiment (Armoured Cavalry)
The Royal Lancers (Queen Elizabeth's Own) (Armoured Cavalry)
1st The Queen's Dragoon Guards (Light Cavalry)
The Royal Yeomanry (Army Reserve)

Notes

Order of precedence

Related units
This unit is allied with the following:

 Royal Canadian Armoured Corps
 Royal Australian Armoured Corps
 Royal New Zealand Armoured Corps
 Kor Armor Diraja (Royal Armoured Corps) - Malaysia

Colonels Commandant (Cavalry)
Colonels Commandant were:
1939– 	     vacant
1947 	     F.M. The Rt Hon Bernard Law Montgomery, 1st Viscount Montgomery of Alamein, KG, GCB, DSO 
1947– 	     Gen. Sir Richard Loudon McCreery, GCB, KBE, DSO, MC
1950–?1952 Gen. Sir Charles Frederic Keightley, GCB, GBE, DSO
1958–       Gen. Sir Charles Frederic Keightley, GCB, GBE, DSO
1968–       F.M. Sir Richard Amyatt Hull, KG, GCB, DSO
1974–       F.M. The Rt Hon Richard Michael Power Carver, Baron Carver of Shackleford, GCB, CBE, DSO, MC
1977–1980 Gen. Sir Jack Wentworth Harman, GCB, OBE, MC, ADCGen 
1980–1982 Gen. Sir Robert Cyril Ford, GCB, CBE 
1982–1985 F.M. Sir John Wilfred Stanier, GCB, MBE, ADCGen
1985–1988 F.M. Sir Nigel Thomas Bagnall, GCB, CVO, MC
1988–1993 Gen. Sir Brian Leslie Kenny, GCB, CBE
1993–1995 Gen. Sir Anthony Stephen Jeremy Blacker, KCB, CBE 
1995–1999 Lt-Gen. Sir Robert Hayman-Joyce, KCB, CBE
1999 Maj-Gen. David John Malcolm Jenkins, CB, CBE
2000–2004 Maj-Gen. Peter Gilchrist, CB
2004–       Maj-Gen. Alexander Richard David Shirreff, CB

References

External links 

 
 Royal Armoured Corps News
 Land Forces of Britain, the Empire and Commonwealth

 
British administrative corps
UK
Purbeck District
Organisations based in Dorset
Military units and formations established in 1939